T. Karuppusami was elected to the Tamil Nadu Legislative Assembly from the Uppiliyapuram constituency in the 1996 elections. The constituency was reserved for candidates from the Scheduled Tribes. He was a candidate of the Dravida Munnetra Kazhagam (DMK) party.

References

Tamil Nadu MLAs 1996–2001
Dravida Munnetra Kazhagam politicians
Possibly living people
Year of birth missing